State Road 133 (NM 133) is a very short state highway in the US state of New Mexico. NM 133's western terminus is at NM 132 North of Hobbs, and the eastern terminus is at Farm to Market Road 1757 (FM 1757) at the Texas–New Mexico state line.

Major intersections

See also

References

133
Transportation in Lea County, New Mexico